Meroitic Cursive is a Unicode block containing demotic-style characters for writing Meroitic Egyptian.

History
The following Unicode-related documents record the purpose and process of defining specific characters in the Meroitic Cursive block:

References 

Unicode blocks